Coanda or Coandă may refer to:

Henri Coandă, a Romanian inventor
Henri Coandă International Airport, a Romanian airport near Bucharest
The Coandă effect in fluid dynamics
Coandă-1910, an aircraft invented by Henri Coandă
Coanda exhaust, an exhaust used in Formula 1